Angie Brown (born 13 June 1963) is a British singer and songwriter from Brixton, South London.

She is a co-artist on the hit single "I'm Gonna Get You" (1992) by Bizarre Inc and performed on a number of recordings with them as lead vocalist including the single "Took My Love" (1993) released by the record label Vinyl Solution.

Brown performed in the bridge and chorus of the hit "Return of the Mack" by UK artist Mark Morrison and sang the role of the girlfriend. Model Susana Agrippa mimes to Brown's vocals in the music video. As of August 2020, it has attracted in excess of 110,000,000 streams on YouTube.

Brown co-wrote and performed the single "Disco Heaven" with Holly Johnson of Frankie Goes to Hollywood.

She performed vocals on the album Don't Mind If I Do by Culture Club in 1999.

Brown has also performed backing vocals for Grace Jones, Beverley Knight, Mark Morrison, The Rolling Stones, The Dirty Strangers, Happy Mondays, Kate Bush, Chaka Khan, Heaven 17, Neneh Cherry, Lisa Stansfield, Mola Mola, The Stereophonics and Fat Boy Slim.

In 2014, she appeared on an episode of the third series of The Voice UK, singing a live cover version of "I'm Gonna Get You".

Career

1980s 
By 1992, Brown had already made her mark in the recording world of Rock/Post Punk with some excellent work in several bands of the time. She joined The Dirty Strangers (with Ronnie Wood and Keith Richards) performing on their albums "Dirty Strangers" and "Diamonds".

She was a brief member of the group Thrashing Doves (known at that stage of their career as The Doves), and performed lead vocals on their single "Beaten Up in Love Again".

1990s 
She is a co-artist on the Bizarre Inc BPI Certified Silver hit single "I'm Gonna Get You" (1992) and performed on a number of recordings with Bizarre Inc as lead vocalist including "Took My Love" (1993).

She is the featured vocalist on UK top twenty UK track "Rockin' for Myself" by Motiv8.

Brown performs in the bridge and chorus of the BPI 2 x Platinum Certified hit "Return of the Mack" by UK artist Mark Morrison and features as a performer playing the role of the girlfriend in both the official single release and official music video in which model Susana Agrippa mimed to Brown's lead vocal section of the recording – As of August 2020 it has attracted in excess of 110,000,000 streams on YouTube. She also performed on other tracks from the album Return of The Mack including the UK top 20 hit "Crazy".

2000s 
She performed backing vocals for Midge Ure on two tracks; "Beneath A Spielberg Sky" and "Somebody" taken from the album Move Me, released 25 September 2000. In 2001 she recorded backing vocals on Danish Pop Musician Thomas Helmig on the RCA/BMG (Denmark) released Album "IsityouIsitme". In 2003 Brown was to come in as a session vocalist on Welsh rock band Stereophonics' album You Gotta Go There to Come Back, singing on three tracks: "Jealousy", "High as the Ceiling", and the hit record and BPI Gold Certified "Maybe Tomorrow". She is credited as backing vocalist on Dutch Singer Jamai Loman's album by the same title released on BMG (The Netherlands) in 2003.

2010s 
In 2014 Brown was approached by British/Canadian DJ Kissy Sell Out, co-writing and singing on the San City Record/Vicious Vinyl and Carrillo Music release called "Deeper In Love".

Brown's vocals are featured throughout "The Mack" by Swedish DJ Nevada, Mark Morrison and Fetty Wap. Nevada's version features the original vocals of Mark Morrison and Angie Brown, and additional vocals from American rapper Fetty Wap. The song was written by Morrison, William Maxwell, Pyramids in Paris, and Jonathan White. It was released to digital download through Straightforward Music, Nourishing Music, and Capitol Records on 23 September 2016. This song has since received commercial successful reaching 2 x Platinum Certified in Australia, Gold Certified in the US and New Zealand, and Silver in the United Kingdom, while making chart appearances in many other countries.

2020s 
Angie Brown collaborated with DJ Dougal and Ollie Jacobs on a track released on London based record label Champion Records.

See also
List of number-one dance hits (United States)
List of artists who reached number one on the US Dance chart

References

External links
 Official site
 Angie Brown Discography on Discogs
 Angie Brown Discography on MusicBrainz
 Angie Brown on AllMusic

20th-century Black British women singers
21st-century Black British women singers
Living people
People from Clapham
Singers from London
1963 births